Nuagisme (literally Cloudism) is a French art-critical term for an art movement that was advanced in the 1950s by French art critic Julien Alvard (1916–1974) in which young French and foreign painters participated in France. Nuagisme lasted between 1955 and 1973.

Art historical context
The major contribution of Nuagist painting was to find (and encourage) transparency and depth in painting that the cold flatness of Geometric abstraction had rejected from the pictorial field. Nuagisme can be considered part of the art movements called Lyrical Abstraction, Arte Informale and Tachism.

Style
René Duvillier's whirlpools, Frédéric Benrath's knots and volutes, Fernando Lerin's obscure forms reflected Nuagisme's openness to natural elements which can sometimes evoke clouds. Most Nuagisme exhibitions were organized between 1955 and 1973 by Alvard. The painters participating in these exhibitions were not always the same, but were regularly influenced both by American Abstract expressionism and by the Japanese painting and Chinese painting traditions. For example, Nuagisme is marked by the use of emptiness, which suggests infinity.

Nuagist painters embraced the imaginative faculties of natural effects, leading to painted abstract landscapes designed as a link between external nature and the internal landscape. They do not reproduce skies in a figurative approach, but paint clouds for their vitality. Materialism is also called into question by the Nuagist painters who expressed the fluidity of elusive spaces by blotting with a rag on freshly painted backgrounds. This blotting contributed to the desired Nuagist transparency effect.

Artists
Jean Messagier
Frédéric Benrath
René Duvillier
Pierre Graziani
René Laubiès
Marcelle Loubchansky 
Nasser Assar
Fernando Lerin

References
Alvard Julien, Témoignages pour l'art abstrait, Paris, Editions Art d'aujourd'hui, 1952
Alvard Julien, L'Art moral ou la répétition punie, Imprimerie Le soleil, 1957
M. A.-L, Une jeune femme, deux Américains, un nuagiste, in Les Lettres françaises no 1118 du 16 au 16 février 1966, p. 29
Benrath Frédéric, Catalogue de l'exposition Le nuagisme même, Musée des Beaux-arts de Lyon, 1973
Bonnefoi Geneviève, Les années fertiles 1940-1960, Paris, Mouvements Editions, 1988
Brichet Isabelle, Le Nuagisme, Paris, Université de Paris IV Sorbonne, 2006
Calmon Michel, Catalogue de l'exposition au musée des Beaux-arts de Chartres, Chartres, Musée des Beaux-arts de Chartres, 2008
Calmon Michel, Nuages-nuagisme, Area Revue, no 22, 2010
Alvard Julien, D'une nature sans limites à une peinture sans bornes, Art d'aujourd'hui, July 1953
Gassiot-Talabot Gérald, Le nuage crève, Cimaise, Jully 1964
Gassiot-Talabot Gérald, Les nuagistes, Opus International, November 2011
Grenier Jean, Le nuagisme, Chefs-d'œuvre de l'art, September 1963
Rey Jean-Dominique, Le nuagisme, Jardin des arts, 1965

Notes

Contemporary art movements
French art movements
Abstract art
Avant-garde art
Modern art
French art